The 1915 College Football All-Southern Team consists of American football players selected to the College Football All-Southern Teams selected by various organizations in 1915. Josh Cody and Baby Taylor were selected third-team All-Americans by Walter Camp, and Bully Van de Graaff was selected for his second-team. Van de Graaff was Alabama's first ever All-American.  Buck Mayer of the 8–1 Virginia Cavaliers was the south's first consensus All-American, selected first-team All-American by Frank G. Menke and Parke H. Davis.  The "point-a-minute" Vanderbilt Commodores won the SIAA.

Composite eleven

The composite All-Southern team selected by ten sports writers and coaches included:
Josh Cody, tackle for Vanderbilt, inducted into the College Football Hall of Fame in 1970, only three-time All-American in Vanderbilt football history. Third-team Camp All-American. He was selected for the Associated Press Southeast Area All-Time football team 1869-1919 era. Later a prominent football coach at many institutions.
Rabbit Curry, quarterback for Vanderbilt, unanimous selection. During the First World War, he was killed in aerial combat over France. He was a beloved player of Coach McGugin, described by one writer as "the player who has most appealed to the imagination, admiration, and affection of the entire university community through the years."
Russ Cohen, end for Vanderbilt, later an assistant under Wallace Wade at Alabama and head coach at LSU and Cincinnati.
Wooch Fielder, halfback for Georgia Tech, later an influential veteran of the Second World War.
John G. Henderson, center for Georgia, the head of a group of three men, one behind the other with his hands upon the shoulders of the one in front, to counter Georgia Tech's jump shift offense utilized by John Heisman. The game ended 0–0. He also played baseball and was later Georgia baseball coach.
Bob Lang, guard for Georgia Tech, the first guard selected for the Heisman era All-Era Tech football team.
Walter Neville, fullback for Georgia, made All-Southern in his first year on the varsity.
David Paddock, quarterback for Georgia, the only player in school history to have a petition circulated by the student body requesting that he play for the Bulldogs.
Baby Taylor, guard for Auburn, unanimous selection. Weighing just under 200 pounds, Taylor would be a small player today, but he was then considered quite large, "worth three ordinary men." Miss Virginia Gilmer, an Auburn fan of some 13 years of age once told Taylor that “if she were a boy and as big as he and had any sense at all she would be an all-southern tackle.” Third-team Camp All-American
Charlie Thompson, end for Georgia, captain-elect but ruled ineligible for next year.
Bully Van de Graaff, tackle for Alabama, unanimous selection. He was selected for the Associated Press Southeast Area All-Time football team 1869-1919 era. Alabama's first All-American, and brother of the inventor of the Van de Graaff generator which produces high voltages. Second-team Camp All-American.

Composite overview
Bully Van de Graaff, Baby Taylor, and Rabbit Curry were unanimous selections.

All-Southerns of 1915

Ends 

 Charlie Thompson, Georgia 
 Russ Cohen, Vanderbilt 
 Neil Edmond, Sewanee 
 Jim Senter, Georgia Tech 
 Roy Homewood, North Carolina

Tackles 
 Bully Van de Graaff†, Alabama 
 Josh Cody, Vanderbilt (College Football Hall of Fame) 
 Phillip Cooper, LSU 
 Ted Shultz, Washington & Lee 
 Tom Thrash, Georgia

Guards 

 G. E. "Baby" Taylor†, Auburn 
 Bob Lang, Georgia Tech 
 Bob Taylor Dobbins, Sewanee 
 Pryor Williams, Vanderbilt 
 C. M. Hamilton, Vanderbilt 
 George Steed, Auburn 
 Kirby Lee Spurlock, Mississippi A&M

Centers 
 John Henderson, Georgia 
 Yank Tandy, North Carolina 
 Carey Robinson, Auburn 
 R. McArthur, Mississippi A & M

Quarterbacks 

 Rabbit Curry†, Vanderbilt 
 David Paddock, Georgia

Halfbacks 
 Wooch Fielder, Georgia Tech 
 Froggie Morrison, Georgia Tech 
 Everett Strupper, Georgia Tech (College Football Hall of Fame) 
 Paul Squibb, Chattanooga 
 Johnny Barrett, Washington & Lee 
 Buck Mayer*, Virginia 
 Homer Prendergast, Auburn 
 Clyde Littlefield, Texas

Fullbacks 

 Walter Neville, Georgia 
 Charles C. Schrader, Kentucky 
 Hal Hunter, Transylvania 
 Pete Mailhes, Tulane 
 Bedie Bidez, Auburn 
Hubert Wiggs, Vanderbilt

Key 
Bold = Composite selection

* = Consensus All-American

† = Unanimous selection

C = received votes for a composite All-Southern eleven selected by ten sports writers and coaches, including those from Memphis, Nashville, Atlanta, Birmingham, Chattanooga, and New Orleans. Votes for multiple positions are combined.

TC = Another composite, using eleven sportswriters, published by the Tennessean.

H = selected by John Heisman, published in Fuzzy Woodruff's A History of Southern Football.

DJ = selected by Dick Jemison in the Atlanta Constitution.

NT = selected by the Nashville Tennessean.

SP = selected by the Sewanee student newspaper, the Sewanee Purple.

See also
1915 College Football All-America Team

References 

1915 Southern Intercollegiate Athletic Association football season
College Football All-Southern Teams